ŽKK Sloboda Novi Grad is a women's basketball club from Novi Grad, Bosnia and Herzegovina.

Honours

Domestic
National Cups – 0

Bosnian Cup
Runners-up (1) : 2013

External links
Profile at eurobasket.com

Basketball teams established in 1980
Women's basketball teams in Bosnia and Herzegovina